Maasai may refer to:
Maasai people
Maasai language
Maasai mythology
MAASAI (band)

See also
 Masai (disambiguation)
 Massai

Language and nationality disambiguation pages

Maasai People were a very old tribe in the sorthern part of Africa.